Victor Fremont Lawson (September 9, 1850 – August 19, 1925) was an American newspaper publisher who headed the Chicago Daily News from 1876 to 1925. Lawson was president of the Associated Press from 1894 to 1900, and was on the board of directors from 1900 to 1925. Outside of the newspaper business, he was involved in various philanthropic causes in Chicago. In 1919 he was appointed to the Chicago Commission on Race Relations.

Biography
He was born in Chicago on September 9, 1850 to Iver Lawson (1822–72) and Melinda (Nordvig) Lawson (1827-1896). He had a brother,  Iver Norman Lawson (1865-1937).

He died of a heart attack in 1925 in Chicago. He was interred at Chicago's Graceland Cemetery where his grave is marked with a sculpture of a medieval knight designed by Lorado Taft.

Publishing
Lawson's family grew rich from real estate dealings in Chicago, and held stakes in a Norwegian-language newspaper called the Skandinaven. The Chicago Daily News, founded by Melville E. Stone, Percy Meggy and William Dougherty in 1875, was a tenant in the same building as the Skandinaven. The Daily News was struggling, but Victor Lawson decided to invest in it in July 1876, becoming its manager. Within twenty years, its circulation grew to 200,000 people. Lawson mainly focused on the business aspects of the paper, while Stone and others worked as editors. Helping to fuel the paper's success was Lawson's ability to attract advertisers. Lawson provided clear circulation figures to businesses and promised consistent rates for advertisements.

The Daily News employed Eugene Field, one of the first major newspaper columnists, and contained a mix of fiction, household advice, and reports on city happenings. David Paul Nord writes, "It was quintessentially an urban newspaper, committed to private business but also to activist government, to social welfare, and to the broad public life of the city. It was a progenitor of the kind of progressive reform politics that came to flower in many cities during the early twentieth century." In 1898, Lawson founded an early foreign news service, which became a key component of the Daily News.

References

Further reading
 Abramoske, Donald J. "The Founding of the Chicago Daily News." Journal of the Illinois State Historical Society (1966): 341–353. in JSTOR
 Cole, Jaci, and John Maxwell Hamilton. "A Natural History of Foreign Correspondence: A Study of the Chicago Daily News, 1900-1921." Journalism & Mass Communication Quarterly (2007) 84#1 pp: 151–166.
 Dennis, Charles Henry. Victor Lawson: his time and his work (1935; reprint Greenwood Press, 1968); 471pp; scholarly biography
Sawyers, June Skinner; Rick Kogan (2012) Chicago Portraits: New Edition (Northwestern University Press)

External links

Inventory of the Victor Lawson Papers, Ca. 1860-1931 (Newberry Library)
Lawson Field (Wheaton College)
 Victor Lawson Tower (Chicago Theological Seminary)

1850 births
1925 deaths
Businesspeople from Chicago
American newspaper publishers (people)
Burials at Graceland Cemetery (Chicago)